Arizona Charlie's Boulder is a 301-room hotel and a  locals casino located in Paradise, Nevada, United States. It is owned and operated by Golden Entertainment. It is located on Boulder Highway between Boulder Station and Sam's Town.

History
Arizona Charlie's Boulder and Arizona Charlie's Decatur are the result of original efforts by the Becker family, long established developers in Las Vegas. In January 2000, American Casino & Entertainment Properties (ACEP) purchased the Sunrise Suites on Las Vegas' Boulder Highway for $43.3 million. The property's hotel had already opened, but without its casino portion, as the prior owner failed to receive a gaming license. The casino opened on May 23, 2000, when the entire property was renamed Arizona Charlie's East. It was a companion to Arizona Charlie's West (later Arizona Charlie's Decatur), also owned by ACEP. The two properties are 10.4 miles apart. The casino's namesake was "Arizona" Charlie Meadows, a performer in Buffalo Bill's Wild West Show and a distant relative of the original owners of Arizona Charlie's Decatur, the Becker family.

The property was renamed Arizona Charlie's Boulder on January 1, 2003.

In October 2017, Golden Entertainment acquired Arizona Charlie's Boulder as part of its $850 million purchase of ACEP.

See also
 Arizona Charlie's Decatur

References

2000 establishments in Nevada
Casino hotels
Casinos in the Las Vegas Valley
Golden Entertainment
Hotel buildings completed in 2008
Hotels in Paradise, Nevada